891 Naval Air Squadron was a fighter squadron of the Royal Navy's Fleet Air Arm during World War II.

The squadron was disbanded in April 1943, but was reformed in June 1945 and equipped with Hellcat IIs in order to operate in the Pacific, but the war ended before they could be deployed. The squadron was disbanded in September 1945.

On 8 November 1954 891 NAS was recommissioned with de Havilland Sea Venom FAW 20s under the command of Lt.Cmdr. M. A. Birrell, DSC. The squadron was initially equipped with two Sea Venoms and four Sea Vampire T22s, then on 1 March 1955 the squadron formed an 'X' flight commanded by Lt.-Cmdr. G. M. Jude, Royal Australian Navy, to train RAN crews in preparation for the formation of 808 RAN Squadron in August 1955. 891 replaced its Mk.20 Sea Venoms with Mk.21s in June 1955, then in April 1956 the squadron disbanded, only to reform in December 1957 under the command of Lt.-Cmdr. J. F. Blunden at RNAS Merryfield with Sea Venom FAW Mk.22s. 891 was the last Sea Venom squadron to see active service when operating from  it became involved in Operation Damen, carrying out rocket attacks against Yemeni rebel infiltrations in Aden. 891 NAS disbanded as the last frontline Sea Venom squadron in July 1961.

References

 
 

800 series Fleet Air Arm squadrons